Tetrahymena pyriformis is a species of Ciliophora in the family Tetrahymenidae.

It is one of the most commonly ciliated model used for laboratory research.

The species is widely distributed. It lives in fresh water like springs, ditches, creeks, ponds, and lakes.

References 

Oligohymenophorea